Satoblephara owadai is a species of moth of the family Geometridae. It is found in Taiwan.

Taxonomy
It was formerly treated as a subspecies of Satoblephara parvalaria.

References

Moths described in 1978
Boarmiini